The 2022 Sakhalin Oblast Duma election took place on 9–11 September 2022, on common election day. All 28 seats in the Oblast Duma were up for reelection.

Electoral system
Under current election laws, the Oblast Duma is elected for a term of five years, with parallel voting. 10 seats are elected by party-list proportional representation with a 5% electoral threshold, with the other half elected in 18 single-member constituencies by first-past-the-post voting. Until 2022 the number of mandates allocated in proportional and majoritarian parts were standing at 14 each. Initially, 7 party list mandates and 21 single-member constituencies were proposed, however, this model was declared unconstitutional as it could create a situation, where there would be not enough seats for every qualified party. Seats in the proportional part are allocated using the Imperiali quota, modified to ensure that every party list, which passes the threshold, receives at least one mandate ("Tyumen method").

Candidates

Party lists
To register regional lists of candidates, parties need to collect 0.5% of signatures of all registered voters in Sakhalin Oblast.

The following parties were relieved from the necessity to collect signatures:
United Russia
Communist Party of the Russian Federation
A Just Russia — Patriots — For Truth
Liberal Democratic Party of Russia
New People
Rodina
Russian Party of Freedom and Justice
Yabloko
Communists of Russia

New People and RPPSS will take part in Sakhalin Oblast legislative election for the first time, while For Women of Russia and Patriots of Russia, who participated in the 2017 election, had been dissolved henceforth.

Single-mandate constituencies
18 single-mandate constituencies were formed in Sakhalin Oblast, an increase of 4 seats since last redistricting in 2017.

To register, candidates in single-mandate constituencies need to collect 3% of signatures of registered voters in the constituency.

Results

|- style="background-color:#E9E9E9;text-align:center;"
! rowspan=2 colspan=2| Party
! colspan=5| Party list
! colspan=2| Constituency
! colspan=2| Total
|-
! width="75"| Votes
! %
! ±pp
! Seats
! +/–
! Seats
! +/–
! Seats
! +/–
|-
| style="background-color:;"|
| style="text-align:left;"| United Russia
| 52,359
| 47.20
|  2.56%
| 4
|  5
| 17
|  7
| 21
|  2
|-
| style="background-color:;"|
| style="text-align:left;"| Communist Party
| 15,804
| 14.25
|  2.25%
| 2
|  1
| 0
|  1
| 2
|  2
|-
| style="background-color:;"|
| style="text-align:left;"| Liberal Democratic Party
| 10,200
| 9.19
|  3.83%
| 1
|  1
| 0
| 
| 1
|  1
|-
| style="background-color:;"|
| style="text-align:left;"| New People
| 9,865
| 8.89
| New
| 1
| New
| 1
| New
| 2
| New
|-
| style="background-color:;"|
| style="text-align:left;"| Party of Pensioners
| 7,435
| 6.70
| New
| 1
| New
| 0
| New
| 1
| New
|-
| style="background-color:;"|
| style="text-align:left;"| A Just Russia — For Truth
| 5,706
| 5.14
|  0.60%
| 1
|  1
| 0
| 
| 1
|  1
|-
| colspan="11" style="background-color:#E9E9E9;"|
|-
| style="background-color:;"|
| style="text-align:left;"| Communists of Russia
| 2,827
| 2.55
|  1.57%
| 0
| 
| 0
| 
| 0
| 
|-
| style="background-color:;"|
| style="text-align:left;"| RPSS
| 1,620
| 1.46
|  2.36%
| 0
| 
| 0
| 
| 0
| 
|-
| style="background-color:;"|
| style="text-align:left;"| Rodina
| 795
| 0.72
|  0.45%
| 0
| 
| 0
| 
| 0
| 
|-
| style="text-align:left;" colspan="2"| Invalid ballots
| 4,325
| 3.90
|  0.63%
| —
| —
| —
| —
| —
| —
|- style="font-weight:bold"
| style="text-align:left;" colspan="2"| Total
| 110,936
| 100.00
| —
| 10
|  4
| 18
|  4
| 28
| 
|-
| colspan="11" style="background-color:#E9E9E9;"|
|-
| style="text-align:left;" colspan="2"| Turnout
| 110,936
| 29.67
|  3.65%
| —
| —
| —
| —
| —
| —
|-
| style="text-align:left;" colspan="2"| Registered voters
| 373,907
| 100.00
| —
| —
| —
| —
| —
| —
| —
|-
| colspan="11" style="background-color:#E9E9E9;"|
|- style="font-weight:bold"
| colspan="10" |Source:
|
|}

Former Sakhalin Oblast Duma Speaker Andrey Khapochkin (United Russia) was appointed to the Federation Council, replacing incumbent Yury Arkharov (Independent).

See also
2022 Russian regional elections

References

Sakhalin Oblast
Politics of Sakhalin Oblast
Regional legislative elections in Russia